Quick Reaction Surface-to-Air Missile (QRSAM) is a missile developed by the Defence Research and Development Organisation (DRDO), Bharat Electronics Limited and Bharat Dynamics Limited for the Indian Army, meant for protecting moving armoured columns from aerial attacks.

QRSAM has a fully automated Command and Control System. The missile system possesses two four-walled radars both of which encompass a 360-degree coverage, namely, the Active Array Battery Surveillance Radar and the Active Array Battery Multifunction Radar, apart from the launcher while Laser proximity fuze ensures that missile can't be jammed.

History 
As a part of a replacement program for its obsolete Osa-AK and Kvadrat missile systems, Indian Army received a go-ahead to initiate a global acquisition program for quick-reaction surface-to-air missiles from the Ministry of Defence in September 2007. The acquisition program faced multiple issues, including poor response from vendors and re-tendering to avoid single source acquisition. The missile was developed in association with Bharat Electronics Limited and Bharat Dynamics Limited with both firms participating in development and manufacturing. In 2017, Indian Army's global acquisition program was dropped in favour of the locally developed QRSAM.

The operational version meanwhile is awaiting production in mid-2021 after use trials.

Description 
It's a compact and highly mobile air defence system system mounted on Ashok Leyland Defence Systems 8x8 truck, designed to provide 360 degree defence coverage. The transporter erector launcher (TEL) of the system is developed by Larsen & Toubro, while missiles are manufactured by Bharat Dynamics Limited. Each launcher has 6 missiles and can target 6 different targets. The QRSAM has electronic counter-countermeasure capabilities to remain immune to jamming. The single-staged missile utilized by the system is propelled using solid propellants. The missile is equipped with a midcourse inertial navigation system with a two-way data link and a DRDO-developed terminal active radar seeker. The missile has laser proximity fuze developed by Instruments Research and Development Establishment, to increase accuracy and reduces its susceptibility to jamming. The system has the capability to search and track targets while moving.

Its command and control system, target acquisition and fire control are fully automated. The surveillance and fire control radars developed by Bharat Electronics Limited, namely, the Active Array Battery Surveillance Radar and the Active Array Battery Multifunction Radar are four walled, configured to provide 360 degree coverage. According to DRDO, currently the QRSAM has 90% indigenous component, which is projected to increase 99% incrementally.

Testing 

The first test firing of the missile took place on 4 June 2017. This was followed by the second successful test on 3 July 2017.  The test was conducted from Chandipur, Odisha. Around 100  scientists are working as part of the missile development program led by Defence Research and Development Laboratory (DRDL). DRDO's other labs including Research Centre Imarat (RCI), Research & Development Establishment (Engineers) (R&DE(E)) and Integrated Test Range (ITR) are also contributing to the missile development effort. On 22 December, the missile was test fired for the third time. The test was reported to be a success. The fourth test took place on 8 October 2018 and was reported to be successful. Fifth test was successfully performed on 26 February 2019. The sixth test was conducted on 4 August 2019 at 11:05 am from a mobile truck-based launcher at the launch complex-3 of the Integrated Test Range (ITR) at Chandipur. The seventh-test took place on 23 December 2019 from Abdul Kalam Island, which included two firings of the missile. With this test, the development of the missile was declared complete.

On 13 November 2020, DRDO successfully conducted test fire of the system and achieved a major milestone by a direct hit on to a Banshee pilot-less target aircraft at medium range and medium altitude.

On 17 November 2020, DRDO successfully test-fired QRSAM with live warhead for the first time to check performance parameter of various subsystem. The integrated radar did tracking and target acquisition while mission computer managed automatic launch sequence. Upon missile launch, two way datalink was successfully established and helped activate radar homing guidance at terminal phase. Warhead activation and detonation was achieved when the target was close enough for destruction. The missile managed to hit and bring down an unmanned target vehicle at medium range and altitude.

Six flight tests were completed on 8 September 2022 off the Odisha coast, where QRSAM managed to intercept high speed maneuvering aerial targets with pin point accuracy under long-range medium altitude and short-range high altitude conditions in quick succession salvo firing. The tests were carried out in final deployment configuration with all indigenously developed subsystems including missile with radio-frequency seeker, mobile launcher, automated command and control system, surveillance and multi-function radars.

On 22 September 2022, it was reported by The Economic Times, that deficiencies were observed regarding the mobility, surveillance, detection and firing capability of the system. According to unnamed sources, the system failed to detect and engage hovering helicopters at low altitude and minimum range. There was no official confirmation from Indian Army or Ministry of Defence but according to DRDO, all the tests conducted in September 2022 were successful.

Status 
Each QRSAM system consists of a Regiment Command Post Vehicle (RCPV) connected to three battery units. Each battery unit have Battery Command Post Vehicle (BPCV) and a Battery Surveillance Radar Vehicle (BSRV). One battery unit is connected with four combat groups. The Combat Groups radar could engage 10 targets. One QRSAM system will have 72 missiles.

Operators 

 

 Indian Army

See also 

Trishul
Maitri
Barak 8
Akash-NG
Akash
VL-SRSAM
Advanced Air Defence (AAD)
Prithvi Air Defence (PAD)

References

External links 

Surface-to-air missiles of India
Post–Cold War weapons of India
21st-century surface-to-air missiles
Technical:
 DRDO Technology Focus : Warhead for Missiles, Torpedoes and Rockets